Viola alba, commonly known as white violet, is a species of violet in the family Violaceae.

References
Berichte der Bayerischen Botanischen Gesellschaft zur Erforschung der heimischen Flora 8:257. 1902

Plants described in 1809
alba
Taxa named by Wilibald Swibert Joseph Gottlieb von Besser